United League Baseball was an independent baseball league that operated in Texas. The league operated from 2006 to 2009.  The league then temporarily merged with the Northern League and the Golden Baseball League to form the North American League from 2011–2012. However, after the North American League folded at the end of the 2012 season, ULB was reformed. It dissolved for a second time in January 2015.

History 

The league began its first season on May 16, 2006, with six teams: the Alexandria Aces, Amarillo Dillas, Edinburg Coyotes, Laredo Broncos, Rio Grande Valley WhiteWings and San Angelo Colts.  The San Angelo franchise previously played in the now-defunct Central Baseball League, while the Amarillo Dillas previously played in the now-defunct Texas–Louisiana League. The United League was originally owned by an investor group United Sports Equity LLC followed by former Congressman John Bryant.

In 2013, following the dissolution of the North American League, United League Baseball was reincorporated. The league played an 80-game season from late May to the middle of August, and featured the Edinburg Roadrunners, the Fort Worth Cats, the Rio Grande Valley WhiteWings, the San Angelo Colts, the Texas Thunder, and the Alexandria Aces. Alexandria and Texas were shut down mid-season. Edinburg did not field a team for 2014 and they were replaced by the Brownsville Charros.

The San Angelo Colts announced on July 2, 2014, that they had filed for Chapter 11 bankruptcy protection. Although it was stated at the time that operations would not be affected, the team announced on August 11, 2014, that the final eight games of the 2014 regular season would not be played. Originally scheduled to end August 24, the league's 2014 regular season ended August 15, with the best-of-five championship series between the Cats and the WhiteWings starting August 16. The United League Baseball was looking into possibly expanding to Del Rio, Texas, and was scheduled to meet with city officials in October 2014.

In November 2014, it was announced that the City of Ft. Worth had not renewed the lease at LaGrave Field for the Ft. Worth Cats, thus leaving them without a home for the 2015 season. Through the mismanagement of the league by Bryant and Pierce and having one remaining stadium lease in Harlingen the league was formally disbanded in January 2015.

Franchises

Standings

2006 season

2007 Winter Season

2007 season

^ Clinched Playoff Spot
* Clinched 1st Half Title
** Clinched 2nd Half Title
*** Clinched Regular Season Title

2008 season

* Clinched 1st Playoff Seed
** Clinched 2nd Playoff Seed
*** Clinched 3rd Playoff Seed
**** Clinched 4th Playoff Seed
^ Clinched Regular Season Championship

2009 season

* Clinched 1st Playoff Seed
** Clinched 2nd Playoff Seed
*** Clinched 3rd Playoff Seed
**** Clinched 4th Playoff Seed
^ Clinched Regular Season Championship

2010 season

* Clinched 1st Playoff Seed
** Clinched 2nd Playoff Seed
*** Clinched 3rd Playoff Seed
**** Clinched 4th Playoff Seed
^ Clinched Regular Season Championship

Playoffs

2014 Playoff Results

2013 Playoff Results
Format:  When the league returned for the 2013 season the United League paired the top two regular season teams in a best of 5 ULB Championship series.

2010 Playoff Results
Format:  for the 2010 season the United League playoffs consisted of 4 teams competing in 2 rounds, with the top 4 regular season teams making the playoffs.  In the first round the regular season champion faced the 4th seed while seed 2 faced seed 3 in the best of 3 series.  The winners then advanced to the championship best-of-five series.

2009 Playoff Results
Format:  for the 2009 season the United League playoffs consisted of 4 teams competing in 2 rounds, with the top 4 regular season teams making the playoffs.  In the first round the regular season champion faced the 4th seed while seed 2 faced seed 3 in the best of 3 series.  The winners then advanced to the championship best-of-five series.

2008 Playoff Results
Format:  for the 2008 season the United League playoffs will consist of 4 teams competing in 2 rounds.  In the first round the top two teams at the end of the first half of the season will host the two remaining teams with the best overall winning percentage throughout the season in a best-of-three series.  The winners then advance to the championship which will be played at both parks, with the lower seed hosting game one and the higher seed hosting games two and three of the best-of-three series.

2007 Playoff Results
Format:  for the 2007 season the United League played in a split season format, crowning a first half champion and a second half champion.  The champions then played for the ULB Championship.  If one team was to win both halves, the team with the second-best overall season record would have qualified for the playoffs as a wild card.  The championship series was the best 4 out of 7 games, to be played home and away in a 2–3–2 site format, with home field advantage awarded to the first half champion.

2006 Playoff Results
Format:  for the 2006 season the top four teams in the regular season standings made the playoffs, including the regular season champion and 3 wild card teams.  The playoffs then commenced with two rounds of games to determine the United League champion:

1st Round – Best 2 out of 3 games
Championship – Best 3 out of 5 games

ULB Champions

Key

All-star game
United League Baseball hosted an annual All-Star Game which rotated host cities throughout the league.  Its format in 2008 featured the United League all-stars versus the Golden League all-stars.  In 2006 the first All-Star Game pitted the best team against the all-stars from the rest of the United League.  In 2007 the second All-Star Game pitted Team North (All-Stars from Alexandria, Amarillo and San Angelo) against Team Rio Grande (All-Stars from Edinburg, Laredo and Rio Grande Valley).

The ULB's all-star festivities were a two-day event, the first day featuring various celebrations and recognitions, followed on the second day by the Home Run Derby and the All-Star Game.

Game Results
2006 – United League Baseball All-Stars 12, Edinburg Coyotes 2 (Edinburg, Texas)
2007 – Team North 10, Team Rio Grande 1 (Amarillo, Texas)
2008 – United League Baseball All-Stars 8, Golden League 5 (San Angelo, Texas)

Most Valuable Players
2006 – Edwin Maldonado, Laredo Broncos
2007 – Jonathan Reynoso, Amarillo Dillas
2008 – Luany Sanchez, Laredo Broncos

Home Run Derby Winners
2006 – Jose Olmeda, Edinburg Coyotes
2007 – Juan Lebron, Laredo Broncos
2008 – Andres Rodriguez, San Angelo Colts

League awards

Most Valuable Player
2006 – John Anderson, San Angelo Colts
2007 – Nelson Teilon, Edinburg Coyotes
2008 – Danny Bravo, Amarillo Dillas
2010 – Levy Ventura, Rio Grande Valley

Manager of the Year
2006 – Vince Moore, Edinburg Coyotes; Ricky VanAsselberg, Alexandria Aces
2007 – Ricky VanAsselberg, Alexandria Aces
2008 – Brady Bogart, Amarillo Dillas
2009 – Doc Edwards, San Angelo Colts
2010 – Dan Friova, Laredo Broncos

Pitcher of the Year
2006 – Ryan Harris, Edinburg Coyotes; Santo Hernandez, Alexandria Aces
2007 – Adam Cox (baseball), Alexandria Aces
2009 – Brian Henschel, San Angelo Colts
2010 – Wardell Starling, Edinburg Roadrunners

Rookie of the Year
2007 – Ronnie Gaines, San Angelo Colts
2009 – Trent Lockwood, Amarillo Dillas
2010 – Adam De La Garza, Amarillo Dillas; Jonathan Cisneros, Laredo Broncos

Playing Surface of the Year
2007 – Foster Field, San Angelo Colts
2010 – Foster Field, San Angelo Colts

References

External links
 United League Baseball official website

 
2006 establishments in Texas
Defunct independent baseball leagues in the United States
Baseball leagues in Louisiana
Baseball leagues in Texas
Sports leagues established in 2006
2015 disestablishments in Texas
Sports leagues disestablished in 2015